= Infovision Inc. =

- Type: Private
- Industry: Information technology, Digital transformation
- Founded: 1995
- Headquarters: Richardson, Texas, United States
- Area served: Worldwide
- Number of employees: approximately 2,200 (2025)
- Website: www.infovision.com

Infovision Inc. is a privately held global technology company founded in 1996 and headquartered in Richardson, Texas, USA. The company offers services across digital engineering and emerging technologies, including digital media, analytics, and cloud infrastructure.

== History ==
Infovision Inc. was founded in 1995 in Dallas, Texas, focusing on IT consulting and application development. By 2001, the company had secured a place among Dallas’s Top 100 fastest-growing private companies.

In 2002, Infovision Inc. was ranked on the Inc. 500 list of fastest-growing private companies in the United States.

In 2005, the company was included in the MBN 100 list, a repeat placement in the Deloitte & Touche Texas Crescent Technology Fast 50, listing among the Dallas 100, and ranking in the Deloitte Technology Fast 500.

During 2013, it established a 200-seater center of excellence in Texas to support a Fortune 200 company, expanding its onshore delivery capabilities. The following year, the company launched dedicated practices in mobility, business intelligence and big data analytics, DevOps, cloud computing, and the Internet of Things (IoT). In 2017, the company set up a third offshore delivery center in Hyderabad, India, and by that time was operating nine global offices with over 700 staff.

In 2019, Infovision Inc. opened its innovation lab, Digit7 (formerly NxTGEN iLabs), in Texas, focusing on rapid prototyping, proof of concepts, and solution conceptualization. In 2022, the company launched its first nearshore development center, a 300-seater facility in Guadalajara, Mexico. On February 23, 2023, Infovision Inc. and IIT Hyderabad signed an MoU to promote industry-academia collaboration through hybrid classrooms, joint research projects, internships, and training in emerging technologies. In March 2023, the company signed a MoU with the Indian Institute of Technology (IIT) Hyderabad to foster collaboration between industry and academia in technology innovation. By November 2024, Infovision launched AlphaMetricx, an advanced media analytics platform.

== Overview ==
Infovision is a technology services company that provides digital technology and engineering services. Its offerings include application development, cloud infrastructure, Salesforce implementation, data engineering, analytics, and AI and machine learning services.
